Meletius I Pegas (1549 – 12 September 1601) served as Greek Patriarch of Alexandria between 1590 and 1601. Simultaneously from 1597 to 1598 he served also as locum tenens of the Ecumenical Patriarchate of Constantinople. He is honoured as a saint in the Eastern Orthodox Church, with his feast day held on September 13.

Life
Meletius was born in Candia (Heraklion) in the island of Crete, at the time capital of the Venetian Kingdom of Candia in 1549, and he studied classical philology, philosophy and medicine in Padua. He became protosyncellus of the Patriarch of Alexandria Silvester, at whose death he succeeded on 5 August 1590.

Even if he supported the doctrine of transubstantiation, he was a fierce opponent of the Catholic Church, and worked for the reunion of the Greek Church with the Coptic Church. In 1593 he participated in a synod in Constantinople which confirmed the establishment of the Patriarchate of Moscow.

Without resigning as Patriarch of Alexandria, he served as locum tenens of the Ecumenical Patriarchate of Constantinople between December 1596 and February 1597, and from end March 1597 to March or April 1598, when he resigned to go on dealing only with his Egyptian see.

He died in Alexandria on 12 September 1601.

References

16th-century Ecumenical Patriarchs of Constantinople
16th-century Greek people
16th-century Patriarchs of Alexandria
16th-century people from the Ottoman Empire
17th-century Greek Patriarchs of Alexandria
1549 births
1601 deaths
Clergy from Heraklion
University of Padua alumni